Fishman is a surname. Notable people with the surname include:

 Alan H. Fishman (born 1946), American businessman and bank executive
Beverly Fishman (born 1955), American artist
Bill Fishman, American film director
Boris Fishman (born 1979), American writer
Charles Adès Fishman (born 1942), American poet and academic
D.A. Fishman, American communication scholar
David Fishman, American academic and author
Elliot K. Fishman, American diagnostic radiologist
Gerald J. Fishman (born 1943), American research astrophysicist
 Hal Fishman (1932–2007), American newsman based in Los Angeles, who has been the longest-running news anchor in the history of television
Herman Fishman (1917–1967), American basketball and baseball player
Howard Fishman, American musician, writer and playwright
 Irving Fishman (1921–2014), American lawyer and Massachusetts politician
Israel David Fishman (1938–2006), American librarian, founder of the Task Force on Gay Liberation
Jack Fishman (1930–2013), Polish-born American pharmaceutical researcher
 Jake Fishman (born 1995), American-Israeli MLB and Olympic baseball player
 Jay S. Fishman (1952–2016), American manager
Jerry Fishman (born c.1943), American football player
 Jerald G. Fishman (1945–2013), American electrical engineer and businessman
Joelle Fishman (born 1946), American writer and politician from New Jersey
 Jon Fishman (born 1965), American musician
 Joshua Fishman (1926–2015), American linguist
Konstantin Fishman (born 1977), Russian footballer
Louise Fishman (1939–2021), American abstract painter
Mark Fishman, American cardiologist
 Michael Fishman (born 1981), American actor
Mikhail Fishman (born 1972), Russian journalist and television presenter
 Mosess Fishman (1916–2007), American activist, leader of the Abraham Lincoln Brigade
 Naḥman Isaac Fischmann (–1873), Galician writer
 Nina Fishman (1946–2009), American-born British labour movement historian and political activist
Paul J. Fishman (born 1957), American lawyer from New Jersey
Peter Fishman (born 1955), Russian sculptor and painter 
Rob Fishman (born 1986), American entrepreneur and writer 
 Steven Fishman (born 1957), American ex-scientologist, author of the Fishman Affidavit
Sylvia Barack Fishman (born 1942), American feminist sociologist and author
William H. Fishman (1914–2001), Canadian-American cancer researcher
 William J. Fishman (1921–2016), British historian and academic
Yakov Fishman (1913–1983), chief rabbi of Moscow

Fictional characters:
 Chuck Fishman, from the American television series Early Edition

Pseudonyms:

 Fishman (1951–2017), Mexican wrestler, born José Ángel Nájera Sánchez

See also 
 Danny Fiszman (1945–2011), diamond dealer
 Marian Fischman (1939–2001), American psychologist
 Scott Fischman (born 1980), American poker player
 Sheila Fischman (born 1937), Canadian translator

Jewish surnames